"Pete Davidson" (stylized in all lowercase as "pete davidson") is a song by American singer-songwriter Ariana Grande. The song serves as the fourteenth track from her fourth studio album, Sweetener (2018). It was released through Republic Records on August 17, 2018, alongside the album. The song was written by Grande, Victoria Monét and its producers Tommy Brown and Charles Anderson. The song was titled after Grande's then-fiance.

Background

"Pete Davidson" was the last song recorded for Sweetener.

The song was written when Grande and her now ex-fiancé, Pete Davidson, began dating. It was first teased on May 31, 2018, after Grande posted her first picture with Davidson on Instagram with the description: "i thought u into my life 💭 woah ! look at my mind 💡⚡️🙈" which were lyrics later included in the then-upcoming song. On June 7, 2018, Grande confirmed that recently she recorded an interlude for Sweetener. On June 17, 2018, she posted a snippet of the interlude, then on the same day, confirmed the title "Pete". The song was later renamed to "Pete Davidson".

Critical reception
The song generally received positive reviews. Neil McCormick in The Daily Telegraph wrote that the song is "utterly gorgeous, a sweet nothing dissolving into blissful oohs." The Irish Times Louis Bruton said the song "adds a lightness to the record." Brittany Spanos from Rolling Stone said that "Pete Davidson" is "a song that gets the point across with its title alone, she's found her serenity."

Charts

Cover versions
Electronic music producer Jonathan Hay released a dance cover of "Pete Davidson" with a heavy jazz influence titled, "Pete Davidson (Reimagined As House Music)" in December of 2021.

References

External links
 

2018 songs
Ariana Grande songs
Songs written by Ariana Grande
Songs written by Victoria Monét
Songs written by Charles Anderson
Songs written by Tommy Brown (record producer)
Song recordings produced by Tommy Brown (record producer)
Song recordings produced by Charles Anderson
Songs about actors